GR may refer to:

Arts, entertainment, and media

Film and television
 Golmaal Returns, a 2008 Bollywood film
 Generator Rex, an animated TV series
 Guilty Remnant, a cult-like organization portrayed in The Leftovers, an HBO television series

Gaming
 Game Revolution, a video game review web site
 GeneRally, a racing game
 GamesRadar, a website owned by Future Publishing
 Ghost Recon, a video game series

 Ghost Reveries, a 2005 album by Opeth

Companies, groups, and organizations
 Aurigny Air Services (IATA airline designator)
 Gemini Air Cargo (IATA airline designator)
 Globalise Resistance, a UK anti-capitalist group
 Gonnema Regiment, an infantry regiment of the South African Army
 Goodrich Corporation, an aerospace manufacturer in Charlotte, North Carolina, United States
 Greetings & Readings, an independent bookseller
 Toyota Gazoo Racing, Toyota's racing division

Places
 Garden Reach, a neighbourhood of Indian city Kolkata
 Giurgiu County, a county in Romania
 Graubünden, a canton of Switzerland
 Grand Rapids, MI, a city in western Michigan
 Greece (ISO and NATO country code GR)
.gr, the internet country code top-level domain for Greece
 Groningen (province), a Dutch province (ISO code NL-GR)
 Province of Grosseto, a Tuscan province of Italy

People
 A Royal cypher
 George VI of the United Kingdom, via the Royal cipher for "Georgivs Rex"
 George V of the United Kingdom, via the Royal cipher for "Georgivs Rex"
 Georgius Rex, Latin form of King George

Science and technology

Physics 

 General relativity, the geometric theory of gravity published by Albert Einstein in 1915

Biology
 Glucocorticoid receptor, a ligand-activated intracytoplasmatic transcription factor
 Glutathione reductase, an important cellular antioxidative enzyme

Computing and the internet
 .gr, the internet country code top-level domain for Greece
 GoodReads, a social cataloging website with database of books, annotations, and reviews
 Google Reader, a former RSS reader service from Google
 Graphics Resolution, a graphics mode for Apple II-family computers

Technology
 Ricoh GR digital cameras, a series of digital cameras manufactured by Ricoh
 Ricoh GR (large sensor compact camera), the current line of cameras in the GR series
 GR series guitar synthesizers produced since 1977 by the Roland Corporation of Japan
 Toyota GR engine series of petrol-fuelled V6 engines, produced since 2002

Other sciences
 GR, the METAR reporting code for hail 5 mm (0.20 in) or greater in diameter
 Galois ring, in mathematics
 General relativity, a theory of gravitation proposed by Albert Einstein
 Gradian, a unit of plane angle 
 Gradshteyn and Ryzhik informal title of Table of Integrals, Series, and Products, a classical book in mathematics
 Grain (measure) (gr), a unit of mass
 Grashof number, noted as "Gr" in physics
 Gutenberg–Richter law

Other uses

G.R., for General Register, when citing Supreme Court cases in the Philippines
 GR footpath, a type of long-distance footpath in western Europe
 Gabriel Richard High School, a private high school in Michigan
 Ghost Rider (disambiguation)
 Golden Retriever, a type of dog breed
 Government relations, relations between an organisation and the government
 Green Line (Washington Metro)
 Gwoyeu Romatzyh, a system of romanization for Chinese
London North Eastern Railway, has a reporting mark of GR.
Good Riddance (band), a punk rock band from Santa Cruz, California

See also

 
 
 
 
 GRS (disambiguation)
 R (disambiguation)
 G (disambiguation)
 RG (disambiguation)